Mark Tisdel (born September 21, 1955) is an American insurance agent and Republican politician from Michigan. He was elected to the Michigan House of Representatives from the 45th district in 2020. For the 2022 election cycle, he was redistricted into 55th district where he won a second term in office.  Tisdel has served as president of  both Pontiac, and Rochester Hills City Councils

References 

Living people
21st-century American politicians
Republican Party members of the Michigan House of Representatives
Politicians from Detroit
1955 births

People from Pontiac, Michigan